Jorge Macías Gurrola (born July 5, 1984) is a Mexican football manager and former player.

References

1984 births
Living people
Mexican footballers
Association football forwards
C.F. Mérida footballers
Liga MX players
Mexican football managers
Liga MX Femenil managers
Footballers from Durango
People from Gómez Palacio, Durango